Nestrans (The North East of Scotland Transport Partnership) is a partnership between Aberdeen City Council and Aberdeenshire Council which was a voluntary partnership until it was made statutory by the then Scottish Executive (now Scottish Government), in 2006. Its main role is to develop and deliver strategic transport plans across the North East of Scotland. It is one of seven transport partnerships across Scotland and is based in King Street, Aberdeen.

Regional transport strategy 

Nestrans produced a Regional Transport Strategy which was approved by Scottish Ministers in 2008. A Refresh was approved by the Minister for Transport & Veterans in January 2014, providing strategic policies and proposals covering the period to 2035.  Aberdeen City and Aberdeenshire Councils’ Local Transport Strategies are written by the respective authorities to complement the Regional Transport Strategy. The strategic work carried out by Nestrans includes planning and delivery in partnership, enhancements to the following.

Strategic road network 

This includes the Aberdeen Western Peripheral Route (AWPR) dualling the A90 road between Balmedie and Tipperty, plans to improve the Haudagain roundabout, Bridge of Dee and Inveramsay Bridge. The organisation also commissioned a "Locking in the benefits" plan for the City and Shire to ensure that the advantages of the AWPR are maintained in the longer term.

Bus infrastructure 

Improvements including new park and ride sites and bus priority measures. Nestrans supported a shuttle bus between Dyce railway station and Aberdeen Airport, which is now operated commercially by Stagecoach Bluebird. Nestrans is a member of the Local Authority Bus Operators Forum which is a key organisation delivering agreed quality standards for bus services in the region

Rail improvements 

These include the re-opening of Laurencekirk railway station in May 2009, development of a new station at Kintore that opened in 2020, increasing the number of local trains and working with Transport Scotland to improve and increase rail speeds and the number of trains serving the North East from Edinburgh, Glasgow and Inverness. Nestrans is also involved with the national High Speed Rail proposals, seeking to ensure that the benefits of any such major national investment are also experienced in the north east of Scotland.

Aviation 

Nestrans works with operators to encourage the development of Aberdeen Airport and routes from the area to key destinations in the UK and Europe.  Nestrans has sought assurances that additional slots released at London Heathrow Airport are retained for domestic flights from peripheral airports such as Aberdeen.

Ports and ferries 

Nestrans co-operates with Aberdeen Harbour Board, Peterhead Harbour Board and other port authorities in the region, to encourage haulage of freight by sea where appropriate.  The Northern Isles ferry services to Orkney and Shetland operate from Aberdeen and Nestrans liaises with the operator and neighbouring partnerships on matters of mutual interest.

Active travel 

Nestrans delivers improvements to the strategic cycle network including supporting cycle networks in Peterhead and Fraserburgh and implementing a new bridge at West Cults on the high quality Deeside Line, and off-road paths from the North and South of the region. Nestrans is a partner in the Health and Transport Action Plan with NHS Grampian and other public bodies. Nestrans supports the walkit.com website  for planning walking trips in and around Aberdeen City.

Travel plans 

Nestrans assists companies to develop travel plans either as part of the planning process or voluntary to help with specific site problems. It maintains a free on-line travel plan builder Travel Know How and helps to monitor the effectiveness of travel plans. Nestrans is also active in supporting local authorities to develop School Travel Plans.

Getabout 

Nestrans is a partner in the multi-agency Getabout partnership  which promotes sustainable and active travel. They run events and promotions including promoting Park and Ride, Bike Week and European Mobility week. It uses its website, Facebook page, Twitter, radio broadcasting, billboards and promotional items to encourage a change in travel behaviour.

References

External links 

 NESTRANS website

Transport in Aberdeenshire
Transport in Aberdeen
Regional Transport Partnerships in Scotland
Transport in Scotland